Krao Farini (1876 – 16 April 1926) was an American sideshow performer, who was born  with hypertrichosis and took part in 19th-century exhibition tours in North America and Europe. She was adopted by William Leonard Hunt, also known as Guillermo Antonio Farini, who exploited her appearance. Throughout her life she was falsely advertised as a primitive human and billed as the missing link between humans and apes.

Origins
Accounts from her early career have Krao Farini being born in Laos, then a province in northern Siam. As is the case with biographic accounts of most sideshow performers, it is unclear how much of her known life is fictitious. 

It is claimed that in January 1881, Krao and her parents were captured during an expedition conducted by the explorer Carl Bock to what is now northern Thailand and Laos. An anthropologist named Dr. George Shelly was part of the expedition and took charge of Krao. Krao was described as being part of a primitive tribe of humans called "Kraos-monink" all of whom were covered in hair and lived in trees. 

The Siamese had to be bribed by Bock and Shelley into capturing them because of the belief that it was bad luck to kill or capture Kraos-monink. Krao's mother was detained in Bangkok and her father died from cholera. They were said to lack the knowledge of fire and survived upon fruits, fish, and nuts. Her name was said to mean "ape" in Siamese. She was also described as having a number of anatomically unusual features in addition to her body hair including an extra thoracic vertebra, an extra pair of ribs, cheek pouches, hypermobility of her joints, and lacking cartilage in her ears and nose. 

Another early account of Krao's origins was given by Dr. George G. Shelly. He claimed that about 1874 Carl Bock had been travelling in Burma on behalf of Guillermo Antonio Farini in search of unusually tall people. At the court of the King of Burma, he encountered the grandchildren of a hairy couple (the couple had previously been encountered by European explorers at the court a generation before) . Bock discovered that they had been gifts to the court from the king of Laos. He offered the king of Burma $100,000 for them, but was denied. 

Then in 1882, Dr. Shelly and Bock went on several expeditions in search for hairy people. They met at Singapore and traveled to the Rembau District in Malaysia in search of a race of ape people called "Jaccoons". Failing in Malaysia, they continued onwards to Rangoon and then to Bangkok. There they were provided with an escort, twenty elephants, and letters of introduction to the king of Laos. Four months later they reached the Laotian capital, which Shelly called "Kjang-Kjang". The king of Laos provided them with a military escort into swamps deep into the interior of the country. There they captured Krao and her parents. They returned to the king of Laos who refused to let Krao's mother leave the country. The entire expedition came down with cholera at Chiang Mai and Krao's father died there.

A later account had Guillermo Antonio Farini having become aware of the Krao people after a conversation with naturalist Francis Trevelyan Buckland about such people being kept in the court of the Kings of Burma. Farini engaged the son of the Queen Victoria's jeweler to acquire some Krao people from the king of Burma. The king refused due to the belief that his reign would come to an end if the Krao people left the country. Krao's father, named Schua Mayong, was being held at the court along with her mother, and herself. They had been given to the king of Burma as a gift from the King of Laos. 

Farini then arranged for an expedition to be led by Carl Bock to find the Krao people. He encountered thirty to forty of them, but was not able to capture any of them. Bock returned to the king of Burma, who eventually agreed to let Bock take Krao and her father. The entire expedition came down with cholera at Chiang Mai and Krao's father died there. Six weeks after recovering, the expedition reached Bangkok. The king of Siam tried to prevent Bock from taking Krao to Europe. Prince Kronoiar intervened as Bock had done a service for him. Bock was allowed to leave on the condition that Farini would adopt Kher.

Career
Krao, Shelly, and Bock arrived in London in October 1882. By 1883, Krao was being exhibited in Europe as an example of a missing link between humanity and apes and proof of Charles Darwin's theory of evolution. There she learned German and some English. During that time, she was exhibited by  Guillermo Antonio Farini at the Royal Aquarium in Westminster. She was given the surname of Farini at some point after her capture by sideshow promoter  Guillermo Antonio Farini when he adopted her. In early November 1884, she arrived in Philadelphia and was said to be eight or nine years old at the time. She was still under the care of Dr. George Shelly at the time.

She spent several decades exhibiting herself.

In 1899, Krao did a tour of the British Isles that included appearances in Cardiff and Edinburgh.

She lived the last few years of her life in Brooklyn at 309 East Nineteenth Street. When out in public but not on display she wore a veil. She died from influenza on April 16, 1926, in Manhattan. She requested her body to be cremated in order to avoid her corpse being gawked at.

Gallery

See also 

 Alice Elizabeth Doherty, "The Minnesota Woolly Girl"
 Annie Jones, "The Bearded Woman"
 Julia Pastrana, "Bear Woman", "The Apewoman", "The Nondescript"
 Human zoos

Notes

External links

 bio

1876 births
1926 deaths
Bearded women
People with hypertrichosis
Sideshow performers
Deaths from influenza
Laotian emigrants to the United States
19th-century Laotian women
Ethnological show business